The Russian occupation of Zaporizhzhia Oblast is an ongoing military occupation which began on 24 February 2022, after Russian forces invaded Ukraine and began capturing the southern portion of Zaporizhzhia Oblast. On 26 February, the city of Berdiansk came under Russian control, followed by the Russian victory at Melitopol on 1 March. Russian forces also laid siege and captured the city of Enerhodar, home to the Zaporizhzhia Nuclear Power Plant, which came under Russian control on 4 March. The capital of Zaporizhzhia Oblast, Zaporizhzhia, has not been taken by the Russian army and remains under Ukrainian control.

In May, the Russian government started offering Russian passports to the region's inhabitants. In July, it issued a decree which extended Russian 2022 war censorship laws to Zaporizhzhia Oblast, and included deportation to Russia as punishment. In September, the occupation forces held largely disputed referendums in the occupied areas of Zaporizhzhia Oblast and Kherson Oblast for the oblasts to join the Russian Federation. On 27 September, Russian officials claimed that Zaporizhzhia Oblast's referendum passed, with 93.11% of voters in favour of joining the Russian Federation. Russia signed an accession treaty with the Russian administration of the region on 30 September 2022. Russia annexed Kherson Oblast on 30 September 2022, including parts of the oblast that it did not control at the time. The United Nations General Assembly subsequently passed a resolution calling on countries not to recognise what it described as an "attempted illegal annexation" and demanded that Russia "immediately, completely and unconditionally withdraw".

The Russian-installed occupation force was initially called "Zaporozhye military-civilian administration". Its name was changed to "Zaporozhye Oblast" after the Russian annexation. "Zaporozhye" is the Russian equivalent of "Zaporizhzhia". Melitopol serves as the de facto capital city of the Russian administration due to Russia's lack of control over Zaporizhzhia City, which is the de jure capital. In March 2023, Melitopol became the official capital of the Zaporizhzhia Oblast after the acting head of the Russian-occupied Zaporizhzhia Oblast, Yevhen Balytskyi, signed a decree on moving the de jure capital to the City of Melitopol

Occupation

Administrative divisions 
According to the occupation administration, the Zaporizhzhia Military-Civilian Administration is divided into 5 districts including Berdiansk Raion, Melitopol Raion, Polohy Raion, Vasylivka Raion and Zaporizhzhia Raion.

Berdiansk

On 26 February 2022, Russian troops captured the Port of Berdiansk and the Berdiansk Airport. By the following day, the Russian military had taken full control of the city.

Beginning on 14 March, the port was used as a logistics hub by the Russians to support their offensive in southern Ukraine and in particular the siege of Mariupol. On 21 March, Russian media Zvezda reported on the arrival of amphibious transports in Berdiansk. A Russian navy officer described it as "a landmark event that will open logistical possibilities to the Black Sea Navy".

On 24 March, Ukrainian forces launched an airstrike against the  Saratov, which was destroyed and sunk, and one of the two s took damage but was able to leave the port. At the time, it was the heaviest naval loss suffered by Russia during the invasion, and one of Ukraine's most significant successes.

On 16 January 2023, the head of the occupation of the city, Alexei Kichigin, was killed by an airstrike.

Enerhodar
On 4 March, the city of Enerhodar and the Zaporizhzhia Nuclear Power Plant came under a Russian military occupation.

Oleksandr Starukh, the governor of Zaporizhzhia Oblast, stated on 5 March that Russian forces had left the city after looting it and the situation in the city was completely under the control of local authorities. However, Orlov denied the report and stated that Russian forces still occupied the perimeter of the city and the power plant, with local authorities still managing the city. The Ukrainian military administration for the southeast confirmed on 7 March that Enerhodar was under control of Russian forces.

On 6 March, the IAEA released a statement saying that Russian forces were interfering in the operations of the power plant, stating that "any action of plant management—including measures related to the technical operation of the six reactor units—requires prior approval by the Russian commander," and further stating that "Russian forces at the site have switched off some mobile networks and the internet so that reliable information from the site cannot be obtained through the normal channels of communication". On 9 March, Herman Galushchenko, Energy Minister of Ukraine, claimed that Russian forces were holding the workers at the power plant hostage and had forced several to make propaganda videos.

Melitopol

On 1 March 2022, shortly after the city's capture, citizens of Melitopol held a street protest against the military occupation of the city. The protestors marched and used their bodies to block a convoy of Russian military vehicles.

On 10 March, the director of the Melitopol Museum of Local History, Leila Ibragimova, was arrested at her home by Russian forces, and was detained in an unknown location. One day later, Melitopol's mayor, Ivan Fedorov, was abducted by Russian troops for refusing to cooperate with them and continuing to fly a Ukrainian flag in his office. Russian authorities did not comment on Fedorov's disappearance, but the prosecutor's office of the Russian-backed self-proclaimed breakaway state (located within Ukraine) Luhansk People's Republic accused him of "terrorist activities".

On 12 March, the Zaporizhzhia Oblast regional administration stated that former councillor and member of Opposition Bloc, Halyna Danylchenko, was appointed as acting mayor. Former People's Deputy of Ukraine Yevhen Balytskyi was alleged to be de facto in control of the city's government by the Security Service of Ukraine. Meanwhile, hundreds of people took part in a protest outside Melitopol city hall to demand the release of Fedorov. Olga Gaysumova, head of the non-governmental organization "Conscientious Society of Melitopol" and the organizer of local protests against Russian forces, was arrested. On 13 March, the Melitopol City Council declared that, "The occupying troops of the Russian Federation are trying to illegally create an occupation administration of the city of Melitopol." It appealed to the Prosecutor General of Ukraine, Iryna Venediktova, to launch a pre-trial investigation into Danylchenko and her party Opposition Bloc for treason. Ukrayinska Pravda reported that the Russian military had abducted Melitopol's District Council Chairman Serhiy Priyma and had tried to abduct City Council Secretary Roman Romanov. Meanwhile, Russian military vehicles were seen announcing via loudspeakers that rallies and demonstrations had been prohibited and that a curfew was imposed from 6:00 pm to 6:00 am. On 14 March Ukrayinska Pravda reported that Russian forces had prevented new protests by blocking of the central square of Melitopol. It also said "Two activists were abducted and taken away in an unknown direction."

On 16 March, Fedorov was freed from captivity. Some Ukrainian officials said he was freed in a "special operation". Zelenskyy's press aide Daria Zarivna however later said he was exchanged for nine Russian conscripts captured by Ukrainian forces.

On 23 March 2022, Mayor Fedorov reported that the city was experiencing problems with food, medications, and fuel supplies, while the Russian military was seizing businesses, intimidating the local population, and holding several journalists in custody. On 22 April, Fedorov said that over 100 Russian soldiers had been killed by partisans during the occupation of the city.

Mykhailivka 
On 24 August 2022, the Russian-appointed head of Mykhailivka in Zaporizhzhia Oblast, Ivan Sushko, was assassinated in a car bombing.

Occupation administration

History

Before annexation (March–June 2022)

On 4 March 2022, the former leader of the Anti-Maidan of Zaporizhzhia, Volodymyr Rogov, who calls himself "a member of the Main Council of the Zaporizhzhia Oblast Military-Civilian administration of the Zaporozhye", published in his telegram channel part of the provisions of the program of "comprehensive financial and economic measures for the economic development of the regions of Ukraine controlled by the Russian Federation". This program was written in its entirety in the newspapers published by the occupying authorities, as well as on March 9 in the public "Military-Civilian Administration of Melitopol". According to the BBC, the program was written in a complex bureaucratic style and was similar to other similar documents of the Russian authorities.

On 12 March, Halyna Danylchenko was proclaimed by the Russians as the acting mayor of the city of Melitopol, but Ukrainian sources stated that Yevhen Balytskyi became the unofficial head of the city.

On 18 May 2022, Deputy Prime Minister of the Russian Federation Marat Khusnullin, during a visit to the region, stated that "the region's prospect is to work in our friendly Russian family," and announced the imminent implementation of plans to launch the maximum turnover of the ruble. According to him, pensions and salaries will be paid to residents of the Zaporizhzhia Oblast in Russian currency already within a calendar month.

On 25 May, Vladimir Rogov announced that after the complete capture of the region, it would be annexed by Russia. He also said that a dual-currency zone was introduced in the occupied territory and the coat of arms of Aleksandrovsk from the times of the Russian Empire was installed, with which they began to issue new license plates with the signature "TVR" (a reference to the Taurida Governorate; old numbers are used, but with a "TVR" sticker over the Ukrainian flag). Later a report revealed that Balitsky still used Ukrainian coat of arms of Zaporizhzhia Oblast sometimes on documentations. On the same day, Russian President Vladimir Putin issued a decree on the simplified provision of Russian passports to residents of the Zaporizhzhia Oblast. They will be able to obtain Russian passports under the same procedure as the population of Donetsk and Luhansk Oblasts.

Annexation by Russia and further developments (July 2022–present)
On 28 July, Meduza reported that temporary departments of the Ministry of Internal Affairs of the Russian Federation had been set up in the Kherson and Zaporizhzhia Oblastss of Ukraine.

On 8 August, Balitsky announced at the forum that a referendum on "reunification" with Russia would be held in the region, and signed the corresponding order of the CEC. The election commission, according to the statement, began to form as early as July 23. The referendum is expected to be held in September.

On 8 September, it was announced that referendums would be held in all the occupied territories of Ukraine from 23 to 27 September, the purpose of which is the annexation of these territories. According to the results of the referendum, according to the MCA, 93.11% of voters voted for the region to become part of Russia. After the announcement of the results of the referendum, Balitsky said that "Zaporizhzhia Oblast de facto separated from Ukraine". In September, the administration founded the Pavel Sudoplatov Battalion. On September 28, the Zaporizhzhia MCA announced the withdrawal of the region from Ukraine.

On 24 January 2023, the Wall Street Journal reported an intensification of fighting in the Zaporizhzhia region with both sides suffering heavy casualties.

Composition 
The composition of the administration is published on its website, however, not all members of the administration are listed there, but only the Head, the commandant of Berdiansk, and the deputy for housing and communal services.

The table lists notable members of the administration.

|}

Control of cities in the Oblast

See also

 Russian-occupied territories of Ukraine
 Russian occupation of Crimea
 Russian occupation of Chernihiv Oblast
 Russian occupation of Donetsk Oblast
 Russian occupation of Kharkiv Oblast
 Russian occupation of Kherson Oblast
 Russian occupation of Kyiv Oblast
 Russian occupation of Luhansk Oblast
 Russian occupation of Mykolaiv Oblast
 Russian occupation of Sumy Oblast
 Russian occupation of Zhytomyr Oblast
 Snake Island during the 2022 Russian invasion of Ukraine
 Annexation of Crimea by the Russian Federation
 Russian annexation of Donetsk, Kherson, Luhansk and Zaporizhzhia oblasts

Notes

References 

Zaporizhzhia
Zaporizhzhia military-civilian administration
Southern Ukraine campaign
February 2022 events in Ukraine
March 2022 events in Ukraine
April 2022 events in Ukraine
History of Zaporizhzhia Oblast
Berdiansk
Melitopol